Naresh Bansal is an Indian politician and Member of Parliament from Uttarakhand in the Rajya Sabha. He is a member of the Bharatiya Janata Party. He is a former General Secretary (Organisation) of Bharatiya Janata Party, Uttarakhand and also previously served as its interim president. , he has been involved with party activities for over four decades.

Political career

Naresh Bansal joined the Rashtriya Swayamsevak Sangh (RSS), a Hindu nationalist organisation, at the age of eight, and remains an active member. Bansal has held a variety of positions with RSS. Between 1972 and 1974, he was the city treasurer of the RSS student council. In 2020, it was reported that he had headed the RSS’s disaster management panel for over 20 years.

In 1977 Bansal was elected as district coordinator of student organization Akhil Bharatiya Vidyarthi Parishad (ABVP). He was also part of the Hindu Jagran Manch from 1980 to 1986.

He worked at the government for some time before leaving to join the Bharatiya Janata Party. From 2002 to 2009, Bansal was the state general secretary (organisation) of the Bharatiya Janata Party, Uttarakhand, and served as its interim president. Prior to his election to the Rajya Sabha, Bansal was the vice-chairman of the state-level 20-point programme implementation committee.

In 2012 Bansal was selected as a Rajya Sabha candidate for BJP, ticket but later withdrew. On 2 November 2020 he was elected unopposed from Uttarakhand.

Political positions held 
 2002 - 2009: General Secretary (Organisation), Uttarakhand BJP
 2002 - 2009 : National Executive member BJP India.
 2009 - 2012: Chairman Housing and Development Council, Uttarakhand 
 2012 - 2019 General secretary, Uttarakhand BJP
 2019 - 2020 oct 27 : Vice Chairman of the state-level 20-point programme implementation committee
 2020 - Till Date: Member of Parliament, Rajya Sabha from Uttarakhand state.

References

Living people
People from Dehradun district
Rajya Sabha members from Uttarakhand
Bharatiya Janata Party politicians from Uttarakhand
Rajya Sabha members from the Bharatiya Janata Party
1955 births